Luca Aquino (born June 1, 1974) is an Italian jazz trumpeter and flugelhornist.

Life and career
Born in the town of Benevento, in southern Italy, he was mainly self-taught when he began to play the trumpet at the age of nineteen. For two years he abandoned the practice of the instrument to pursue a master's degree in economics. His love for the sound of Miles Davis and Chet Baker brought him back to the study of trumpet.

In 2007 Universal Music released Sopra Le Nuvole, his first album as leader. A year later he recorded Lunaria with guests Roy Hargrove and Maria Pia De Vito. The album won the Top Jazz award by the Italian magazine Musica Jazz. In 2009, he recorded Amam, then TSC in a church in the Netherlands. In 2010, he recorded Icaro Solo for solo trumpet and electronics in a church in Benevento. After creating the festival Riverberi, a collaboration with Mimmo Paladino led to Chiaro an album in trio with a Norwegian rhythm section and special guest Lucio Dalla. In 2012, after a live album with American trumpeter Jon Hassell for the Church of Saint Augustine in Benevento, he joined the quartet of the percussionist Manu Katché and recorded two albums. In 2013 with the accordionist Carmine Ioanna he recorded aQustico for Tuk Music and embarked on a world tour. In 2015 OverDOORS was a tribute to his favorite rock band, The Doors. In December 2015 he worked with the Jordanian National Association Orchestra on an album in the archaeological site of Petra. The album was made possible by the support of UNESCO Amman Office, the Petra Development and Tourism Authority, and the Talal Abu-Ghazaleh Organization (TAG-Org). An initiative promoted within the framework of the global campaign #UNITE4HERITAGE, started by UNESCO in defense of the artistic and cultural heritage.

After directing the Pozzuoli Jazz Festival and the Bari Jazz on April 7, 2016 he participated in Manu & Friends, sharing the stage of the Olympia in Paris with Sting, Richard Bona, Noa, Stephan Eicher, Raul Midon, and Tore Brunborg. In 2017 a signature trumpet model "Aquino" was handcrafted by the Dutch artisan Hub Van Laar. In 2017 Aquino developed Bell's palsy, an injury to the seventh nerve in his face, forcing him to cancel the Jazz Bike Tour which included fifty concerts to be traveled by bike from Benevento to Oslo.

Style
He was influenced by the early playing of Chet Baker and Miles Davis, for which he was given the nickname  "Apostle of Miles", and by the rock bands The Doors and AC/DC. He is known for  research on natural sound, the use of electronics, and his passion for musical experimentation in unusual places.

Discography

As leader
 Sopra Le Nuvole (Emarcy, 2008)
 Lunaria (Universal Classics & Jazz, 2009)
  "Icaro Solo" - Universal Music 2010
 Chiaro (Tuk, 2011)
 aQustico Tuk/Bonsai, 2013)
 Did You Hear Something? (Leo, 2013)
 Live in Concert (ACT, 2014)
 Rock 4.0 (Musica Jazz, 2014)
 OverDOORS (Tuk, 2015)
 Petra (TAGI, 2016)
 Aqustico Vol 2 (Losen, 2017)
 Italian Songbook'' (ACT, 2019)

AS SIDEMAN & COOLEADER

2020

w ED quartet

w Sade Mangiaracina & Salvatore Maltana

w Mauro Sigura 4et

2016

Vesevus w Solis String & Gianluca Brugnano - Egea

Manu Katchè - Unstatic - Anteprima Production

Sade Mangiaracina – “La terra dei Ciclopi” - Innerc Circle Music

Autor de Chet - Verve

Paolo Freu - Around Tuk - Espresso

Rita Marcotulli - A Pino - Espresso

Francesco Mascio “Ganga’s Spirit” - Emme Produzioni

2015

Planet E - Parco della Musica

Fortitho - 12 Lune

Matthieu Borè - Naked Songs - Bonsai Music

2014

Manu Katché Live in Concert  - Act Music

My Summer Jazz - Bonsai Music

Carmine Ioanna Solo - Bonsai Music

Sardegna Chi_Ama

Niccoló Faraci It Came To Broadcast The Yucatán - Auand

Nina Pedersen Sweet Morning

Piero Delle Monache Thunupa - Auand

2013

Lucio Dalla Dalla in jazz - Sony Music

Lucio Dalla Qui dove il mare luccica - Sony Music

Joe Barbieri Chet Lives - Le Chant Du Monde

Stefano Costanzo Tricatiempo - Auand

Chaos Conspiracy Who The Fuck Is Elvis?- Overdub Recordings

Swedish Mobilia Did you hear something - Leo Records

Mas en Tango Alma - Picanto Records

Il Pentagramma della Memoria

2012

Giovanni Francesca “Genesi” - Auand

Jano Quartet “Distante” - Via Veneto Jazz

Gianni De Nitto “Remixin Standard” - Universal

Lucio Dalla - Qui dove il mare luccica - Sony Music

“The Italian Jazz Job” - Universal Music

“Giovani in tour” - Musiclive/Ismez

La Costituente “Per quanto vi prego” - Altipiani

Mariella Nava “Come un amore” - Edel

2011

Omparty “Petra Janca” - Label Picanto Records

Cherillo meets Aquino “Soffice” Picanto

Marco Bardoscia “The dreamer” My Favorite Records

“The Skopje connection meets Ernst Reijseger” - Losen Record

2010

Pieluigi Villani “Tempus Transit” Universal Music

The Skopje Connection “Amam” - Egea

Remo Anzovino “Igloo” Egea 2010

Chaos Conspiracy - Warner Chappel

Rita pacilio “Se io fossi luna “Splash Record

Aquino “Live Proposals”

Chaos Conspiracy “Indie Rock Makes ME Sick” - Mondadori

2009

Ghemon “Beleave” Digital Record

Marco Zurzolo “Migranti” - Egea

Gentile Giovanni - Mike day 2

Omeparty e Leon Pantarey “L’isola della pomice” - Picanto Records

Marzo Zurdolo "Migranti" - Egea

Fabrizio Savino feat. Luca Aquino “Metropolitan Prints” Alfamusic

2008

Omeparty “L’isola della pomice” - Picanto Record

Rosso Rubino “Tecniche di approccio” - Altipiani

2007

Giuseppe Del Re “Sings Cole Porter” - Abeat Record

2006

Leo Quartieri “Bambimbi Viaggi nel mondo” Leo Rec

2005

Live in BN with Chuck Findley – Riverberi

2004

Eight caught planning - Time in Jazz Record

Wide 5et “Meet me in Sardinja” - Splash Music

External links

References

1974 births
Living people
Italian trumpeters
Male trumpeters
People from Benevento
21st-century trumpeters
21st-century Italian male musicians
ACT Music artists
EmArcy Records artists
Leo Records artists
Losen Records artists